All Over the UK is the debut studio album by British happy hardcore musicians Force & Styles released on 26 August 1996 on United Dance Recordings.

Background
After working together since 1993 as part of DJ Force & the Evolution (with James Broomfield and Paul Hughes), Paul Hobbs and Darren Mew formed Force & Styles in 1995. They founded their own independent record label UK Dance Records to release their recordings and the duo released numerous 12-inch singles during the mid-1990s. All over the UK was recorded at their studio in Clacton-on-Sea, Essex and the album was released on DJ Eruption's United Dance Recordings label on 26 August 1996 and peaked at No. 103 on the UK Albums Chart.

Although most of the songs were released as 12-inch singles on Force & Styles' own UK Dance Records label, two songs from the album were later released as singles on the Diverse record label. "Paradise & Dreams" featuring Junior was released in October 1996 and peaked at No. 106 on the UK Singles Chart and a remixed version of "Heart of Gold" with additional production by pop record producer Eliot Kennedy and ex-Dead or Alive members Tim Lever and Mike Percy featuring vocals from Kelly Llorenna was released in July 1998 and peaked at No. 55 in the UK Singles Chart. Several tracks from this album would later appear on Force & Styles' compilation album Heart of Gold (2000).

"Heart of Gold" was later recorded and released by Kelly Llorenna as a solo single in 2002. This recording of the song was produced by Flip & Fill and peaked higher than the original Force & Styles recording, reaching No. 19 in the charts. In 2003, "Pretty Green Eyes" was covered by Ultrabeat and reached No. 2 in the charts. Several other of Force & Styles' songs would later be covered by Ultrabeat and Flip & Fill, such as "Field of Dreams" (Flip & Fill feat. Jo James), "Frankie's Lead" (Ultrabeat) and "Pacific Sun" (Flip & Fill feat. Junior and Ultrabeat). "Paradise & Dreams" was covered by The Force (Paul Hobbs and Flip & Fill) in 2003 and by Ultrabeat vs. Darren Styles in 2007.

Track listing

Personnel
Force & Styles
 Paul Hobbs – producer (all tracks except track 6), remixing (tracks 6, 9 & 12)
 Darren Mew – producer (all tracks except track 6), remixing (tracks 6, 9 & 12)

Production
 Eruption – producer (track 6), remixing (track 8)
 Dougal – producer (track 6), remixing (track 10)
 Slipmatt – remixing (track 4)

Additional musicians
 Jenna – vocals (tracks 1, 4, 6 & 10)
 Junior – vocals (tracks 2, 5 & 8)

Chart performance

Release history

References

External links
 
 

1996 debut albums
Force & Styles albums